The 2011 UIM F1 H2O World Championship was the 28th season of Formula 1 Powerboat racing. The calendar consisted of seven races, beginning in Doha, Qatar on 5 March 2011, and ending in Sharjah, UAE on 16 December 2011. Italian Alex Carella won the Drivers' World Championship, driving for the Qatar Team.

Teams and drivers

Season calendar

There were a total of 10 individual races originally planned for the 2011 season by the UIM, with events in St Petersburg, Nanyang and Haikou alongside the seven that ultimately took place. These included a brand new race in Vyshhorod which was announced on 25 January, bringing F1 powerboats to Ukraine for the first time. However on 12 April it was announced that the planned race in St Petersburg was to be rescheduled for 2012, with the Kazan race moved back a week to avoid a clash with the Class 1 Norwegian Grand Prix.

Results and standings
Points were awarded to the top 10 classified finishers. A maximum of two boats per team were eligible for points in the teams' championship.

Drivers standings

Teams standings
Only boats with results eligible for points counting towards the teams' championship are shown here.

References

External links
 The official website of the UIM F1 H2O World ChampionshipThe official website of the Union Internationale Motonautique

F1 Powerboat World Championship
Formula 1 Powerboat seasons
F1 Powerboat World Championship
Sport in Kazan